The 2009 ACC Women's Twenty20 Championship was an international women's cricket tournament held in Malaysia from 3 to 9 July 2009. It was the first women's tournament organised by the Asian Cricket Council (ACC) to feature the Twenty20 format of the sport.

Twelve teams participated in the tournament, including five that were making their international debuts (Bhutan, Iran, Kuwait, Oman, and Qatar). The teams were divided into two groups, one of which was topped by Thailand and the other by Hong Kong. Both of those teams eventually progressed to the final at Kinrara Academy Oval, where Hong Kong defeated Thailand by four runs to record their first ACC women's title. The losing semi-finalists, Nepal and China, played off for third place, with Nepal winning by 73 runs.

Group stages

Group A

Group B

Finals

Semi-finals

Final

Placement matches

3rd-place play-off

5th-place play-off

7th-place play-off

9th-place play-off

11th-place play-off

Statistics

Most runs
The top five runscorers are included in this table, ranked by runs scored and then by batting average.

Source: CricketArchive

Most wickets

The top five wicket takers are listed in this table, ranked by wickets taken and then by bowling average.

Source: CricketArchive

Final standing

References 

2009
International cricket competitions in Malaysia
International cricket competitions in 2009
2009 in Malaysian women's sport
2009 in women's cricket